James Randlett may refer to:
 James R. Randlett (born 1942), American politician from Michigan
 James E. Randlett (1846–1909), American architect